Al-Jiza is a town in southern Syria, administratively part of the Daraa Governorate, located east of Daraa. Nearby localities include al-Mataaiya to the south, Ghasm to the southeast, al-Sahwah to the northeast, al-Musayfirah to the north, Kahil to the northwest and al-Taybeh to the west.

History
In  the Ottoman  tax registers of 1596,  it was a village located the nahiya of  Butayna, part of Qada Hawran, under the name of Jiza. It had  a population of 19 households and 7  bachelors, all Muslims. They paid a fixed tax-rate of 40% on agricultural products, including  wheat, barley, summer crops,  goats and beehives, in addition to occasional revenues; a total of 7,215 akçe. All of the revenue went to a waqf.

In 1838, el-Jizeh was noted as a ruin, situated "In the Nukrah, west of Busrah".

According to the Syria Central Bureau of Statistics, al-Jiza had a population of 14,700 in the 2004 census. It is the administrative center of the al-Jiza nahiyah ("subdistrict") which consisted of three localities with a collective population of 21,100 in 2004.

Notable residents
 Hamza Ali Al-Khateeb (1997-2011)

References

Bibliography

External links
Map of the town, Google Maps
 Bosra-map; 22M

Populated places in Daraa District
Towns in Syria